The 1988 Tulane Green Wave football team was an American football team that represented Tulane University during the 1988 NCAA Division I-A football season as an independent. In their first year under head coach Greg Davis, the team compiled a 5–6 record.

Schedule

Roster

References

Tulane
Tulane Green Wave football seasons
Tulane Green Wave football